The exclamatory paradise whydah or Uelle paradise whydah (Vidua interjecta) is a species of bird in the family Viduidae. It is also known as the long-tailed paradise whydah, a name which can refer to Vidua paradisaea.

It is found in Benin, Cameroon, Central African Republic, Chad, Democratic Republic of the Congo, Ethiopia, Ghana, Guinea, Liberia, Mali, Nigeria, Sudan, and Togo.

See also
Indigobird

References

Laws of Botswana: Wildlife Conservation and National Parks Page 116

External links
 The Paradise Whydahs Species Factsheet

exclamatory paradise whydah
Birds of Sub-Saharan Africa
exclamatory paradise whydah
exclamatory paradise whydah
Taxonomy articles created by Polbot